The 2018–19 Northwestern Wildcats women's basketball team represents Northwestern University during the 2018–19 NCAA Division I women's basketball season. The Wildcats are led by 11th-year head coach Joe McKeown. They returned play their home games at Welsh–Ryan Arena after a one year renovation. They are members of the Big Ten Conference.

Roster

Schedule and results

|-
!colspan=9 style=| Exhibition

|-
!colspan=9 style=| Non-conference regular season

|-
!colspan=9 style=| Big Ten regular season

|-
!colspan=9 style= |Big Ten Women's Tournament

|-
!colspan=9 style= |WNIT

Rankings

See also
2018–19 Northwestern Wildcats men's basketball team

References

Northwestern Wildcats women's basketball seasons
Northwestern
Northwestern Wild
Northwestern Wild
Northwestern